Carrollton is an unincorporated community in Brandywine Township, Hancock County, Indiana.

History
Carrollton was platted in 1854.

Geography

References

Unincorporated communities in Hancock County, Indiana
Unincorporated communities in Indiana